Stephen Jacob Williams (born June 29, 1986) is an American football wide receiver who is currently a free agent. He was signed by the Arizona Cardinals as an undrafted free agent in 2010.

College career
He played college football at Toledo, where he set several major team receiving records.

Professional career

Arizona Cardinals
He signed with the Arizona Cardinals as an undrafted free agent in 2010.

Seattle Seahawks
On January 25, 2013, Williams signed with the Seattle Seahawks. He was released by the Seahawks on October 5, 2013, to make room for Bruce Irvin, who finished serving a four-game suspension for performance-enhancing drug use.

Jacksonville Jaguars
On October 7, 2013, Williams was claimed off waivers by the Jacksonville Jaguars.

He was placed on injured reserve on November 23. 

He was released on May 12, 2014.

Miami Dolphins
Williams signed with the Miami Dolphins on May 15, 2014.

References

External links
Official Website
Arizona Cardinals bio
Toledo Rockets bio

1986 births
Living people
Players of American football from Houston
American football wide receivers
Toledo Rockets football players
Arizona Cardinals players
Seattle Seahawks players
Jacksonville Jaguars players
Miami Dolphins players